Galala may refer to:
 Galala (dance)
 Galala marble
 Galala Mountain
 Galala, a place with the postal code 44011 in Arbil Governorate, Iraq